Apocalypse is a studio album by Bill Callahan, released on April 5, 2011. It is the third studio album released under his own name, and fourteenth overall when including LPs released as Smog.

Mojo and Pitchfork both placed Apocalypse at number 23 on their respective lists of the best albums of 2011,  while Uncut placed the album at number 25. In 2019, Pitchfork ranked the album at number 39 on its list of "The 200 Best Albums of the 2010s". In 2021, Beats Per Minute placed the album at number 38 in its "Top 50 Albums of the 2010s."

Track listing

Personnel
 Bill Callahan – vocals, classical guitar, electric guitar, snare, production
 Brian Beattie – bass, mixing
 Gordon Butler – fiddle
 John Congleton – recording
 Luke Franco – flute
 Matt Kinsey – bass, electric guitar
 Jonathan Meiburg – Wurlitzer electric piano, piano
 Neal Morgan – drums
 Roger Seibel – mastering

Charts

References

External links
 Apocalypse at Drag City
 

2011 albums
Bill Callahan (musician) albums
Drag City (record label) albums
Albums recorded at Sonic Ranch